The R4200 is a microprocessor designed by MIPS Technologies, Inc. (MTI) that implemented the MIPS III instruction set architecture (ISA). It was also known as the VRX during development. The microprocessor was licensed to NEC, and the company fabricated and marketed it as the VR4200. The first VR4200, an 80 MHz part, was introduced in 1993. A faster 100 MHz part became available in 1994.

The R4200 was at least in part intended for use in low-power Windows NT computers such as personal computers and laptops, reportedly offering "Pentium processor performance at a tenth of the price", having initially aimed to deliver twice the performance of a 66 MHz Intel 486DX2 processor. Reported SPECint benchmark results put the microprocessor's integer performance at around 85% of a P5-variant Pentium microprocessor, with floating-point performance being about half that of the Pentium. Expected to be used in Nintendo's "new machine due in 1995", the R4300i variant was used in the widely popular Nintendo 64 video game console. The R4200 ultimately did not see any use in personal computers and was repositioned as an embedded microprocessor that competed with the R4600.

Description
The R4200 is a scalar design with a five-stage classic RISC pipeline. A notable feature is the use of the integer datapath for performing arithmetic operations on the mantissa portion of a floating point number. A separate datapath was used for the exponent. This scheme reduced cost by reducing the number of transistors, the size of the chip, and power consumption. It also impacted floating point performance negatively, but the R4200's intended applications did not require high floating point performance.

The R4200 has a 16 KB instruction cache and an 8 KB data cache. Both caches are direct-mapped. The instruction cache has a 32-byte line size, whereas the data cache has 16-byte line size. The data cache uses the write-back write protocol.

The R4200 has a 32-entry translation lookaside buffer (TLB) for data, and a 4-entry TLB for instructions. A 33-bit physical address is supported. The system bus is 64 bits wide and operates at half the internal clock frequency.

The R4200 contained 1.3 million transistors and had an area of 81 mm2. NEC fabricated the R4200 in a 600 nm CMOS process with three levels of interconnect. It was packaged in a 179-pin ceramic pin grid array that was compatible with the R4x00PC and R4600, or a 208-pin plastic quad flat pack (PQFP). It used a 3.3 V power supply, dissipating 1.8 W typically and a maximum of 2 W at 80 MHz.

In comparison to the Pentium, SPECint ratings had the Pentium at 64.5 and the R4200 at 55. SPECfp ratings had the Pentium at 56 versus the R4200 at 30.

R4300i
The R4300i is a derivative of the R4200 designed by MTI for embedded applications announced on 17 April 1995. It differs from the R4200 by featuring an improved integer multiplier with a lower latency and a cut-down 32-bit system bus for reduced cost. The chip had an area of 45 mm2 and was fabricated in a 350 nm process. By employing multiplexed address and data lines, it could be packaged in a low-cost 120-pin PQFP. It uses a 3.3 V power supply and dissipates 1.5 W running at 40 MHz (80 MHz internally), 1.8 W at 100 MHz and 2.2 W at 133 MHz.

The R4300i was licensed to NEC and Toshiba, and was marketed by those companies as the VR4300 or TX4300, respectively. Both companies offered 100 and 133 MHz versions. A derivative of the VR4300 was developed by NEC for the Nintendo 64 game console, clocked at 93.75 MHz and labeled NUS-CPU. Although development boards for the Nintendo 64 used stock NEC VR4300 CPUs, the final CPU has been found to be not pin-compatible. This singular use of a MIPS implementation produced significant royalties for MTI, sales for NEC, and made MIPS the highest volume mixed 32/64-bit RISC ISA in 1997.

NEC produced two other derivatives of the R4300 for the general embedded market, the VR4305 and VR4310, announced on 20 January 1998. The VR4310 was available at 100, 133 or 167 MHz. It was manufactured in a 250 nm process and packaged in a 120-pin PQFP.

References

 "MIPS, NEC will launch 64-bit device". (17 April 1995). Electronic News.
 "NEC Unveils New MIPS Chip for Nintendo". (8 May 1995). Microprocessor Report.
 Gwennap, Linley (31 May 1993). "MIPS Reaches New Lows With R4200 Design". Microprocessor Report, pp. 6–9.
 Levy, Marcus (15 September 1994). "EDN's 21st Annual Microprocessor Directory". EDN.
 Ryan, Bob; Thompson, Tom (January 1994). "RISC Grows Up". Byte.
 Yeung, N.K. et al. (1994). "The design of a 55SPECint92 RISC processor under 2W". ISSCC Digest of Technical Papers. pp. 206–207.
 Zivkov, B.; Ferguson, B.; Gupta, M. (1994). Compcon Spring '94, Digest of Papers. pp. 18–25.

MIPS implementations
MIPS microprocessors
NEC microprocessors
64-bit microprocessors